Raywood J.  Broussard (August 11, 1937 - October 6, 1993) was an American jockey in the sport of Thoroughbred horse racing.

"Ray" Broussard was born in Vermilion Parish, Louisiana, home to many Acadians and an area that would produce a number of other Cajun jockeys including Eddie Delahoussaye, Randy Romero, Shane Sellers, and Ray Sibille.

Like all jockeys from the Bayou country, Broussard began riding at unregulated local Bush tracks. His skills led to a career as a professional jockey, becoming a leading rider at Fair Grounds Race Course in New Orleans who would induct him in their Hall of Fame. Broussard won important stakes races at a number of American racetracks in Florida, Illinois, Kentucky, New Jersey, New York as well as in Toronto, Canada.

In the late 1950s, Ray Broussard was the principal rider for the noted Louisiana stable owners Joe and Dorothy Brown, most notably aboard their colt Tenacious with whom he won back-to-back editions of the Louisiana and New Orleans Handicaps in 1958 and 1959. Broussard also competed in all three of the U.S. Triple Crown races. His best results came in 1970 when, after winning the Flamingo Stakes and Florida Derby aboard the colt, My Dad George, he finished second in both the Kentucky Derby and the Preakness Stakes.

Following his retirement from racing, Broussard made his home in Abbeville, Louisiana. In 1983 he was inducted in the Greater New Orleans Sports Hall of Fame. After a long illness, he died in 1993 in Bossier City, Louisiana at age fifty-six. His four wins in the New Orleans Handicap is a record that through 2009 has not been equaled.

References

1937 births
1993 deaths
American jockeys
Cajun jockeys
People from Abbeville, Louisiana